Hughes is a suburb in the Canberra, Australia district of Woden. The postcode is 2605. The area of the suburb is 1.81 km2.

History

Hughes is named after The Right Honourable William Morris "Billy" Hughes, seventh Prime Minister of Australia from 1915 to 1923.  Streets in the suburb are named with the theme of World War I armed services personnel and contemporaries of William Hughes. The suburb was gazetted on 20 September 1962, with a population of nine. Residential construction began in 1963, and by 1974 Hughes had a population of 4050.

Geography

Hughes adjoins the suburbs of Deakin, Garran, Phillip and Curtin. It is bounded by Carruthers Street to the North, Yarra Glen and Yamba Drive to the west, and the Red Hill area of Canberra Nature Park to the east and south.

Geology
Hughes has several different kinds of rock from the Silurian period.  Shale from the Yarralumla Formation is in the south west.  Cream coloured rhyolite from the Mount Painter Volcanics is found in the north west. Dark purple rhyodacite from the Deakin Volcanics is found in the north of Hughes.  In the south east tuff forms a layer on top of the Mount Painter Volcanics. An inactive north west – south east trending fault runs through the middle of the suburb.  Movement was down on the north east side.

Demographics

Suburb amenities

Shopping

A small shopping centre consists of a take-away restaurant, chemist/sub-newsagency, bakery/cafe, supermarket, post office, dry cleaner, hairdresser, real estate agent, and service station and mechanical workshop.

Recreation

Sporting facilities are North Woden Tennis club and Clarrie Hermes Park (Hughes Oval), as well as three local area playgrounds.

Walking trails commence in the north-east of the suburb which run to the north of Federal Golf Course through to Red Hill Nature Reserve.  Parts of the suburb have views over the Woden valley and the Woden town centre to the northern reaches of the Brindabellas.

Education
Located in the suburb are Hughes primary school and Hughes pre-school.

Religion

There are three churches in Hughes: Jehovah's Witnesses, Canberra Christadelphians and the Baptist Church

Other

St Andrews village is a retirement village, that was controversially built next to Yarra Glen, the highway bounding the west side of the suburb.

References

Suburbs of Canberra